Perla Cristal (born September 29, 1937) is an Argentine actress and vedette and singer who began her career in her native country, with incursions into Hollywood and Spanish and Italian cinema. She settled in Spain in the early 1960s and continued her career in film. 

Cristal's first starring role was in the 1950 film Arroz con leche under director Carlos Schlieper. Other notable films include The Black Tulip (1964), starring Alain Delon and Virna Lisi , and The Corruption of Chris Miller (1972), with Jean Seberg and Marisol. She also appeared in Jess Franco's The Awful Dr. Orloff (1962) and starred opposite Paul Naschy in The Fury of the Wolfman (1972).

Filmography

1950: Rice and Milk
1954: La cueva de Ali-Babá
1962: The Awful Dr. Orlof
1962: I motorizzati (uncredited)
1963: Las enfermeras (TV Series)
1963: Escala en Hi-Fi
1963: Four Nights of the Full Moon
1964: The Mistresses of Dr. Jekyll
1964: Pão, Amor e... Totobola
1964: Primera fila (TV Series, 2 episodes)
1964: The Black Tulip
1964: The Avenger of Venice
1964: La muerte silba un blues
1964: Historias de mi barrio (TV Series, 2 episodes)
1964: La cesta
1964: Búsqueme a esa chica
1964: Un tiro por la espalda
1965: Espionage in Tangiers
1965: La vuelta
1966: Seven Guns for the MacGregors
1966: Novela (TV Series, 1 episode)
1966: Culpable para un delito
1966: Hoy como ayer
1966: The Tall Women
1966: Two Thousand Dollars for Coyote
1967: A Witch Without a Broom
1967: La familia Colón (TV Series, 1 episode)
1967: The Christmas Kid
1967: Crónica de nueve meses
1967: El rostro del asesino
1967: Forty Degrees in the Shade
1967: Seven Vengeful Women
1968: Oscuros sueños de agosto
1968: White Comanche
1968: 1001 Nights
1969: De Picos Pardos a la ciudad
1969: Juicio de faldas
1969: Susana
1970: Versatile Lovers
1970: ¿Por qué pecamos a los cuarenta?
1970: Sin un adiós
1970: Reverend's Colt
1971: El Cristo del Océano
1971: Los jóvenes amantes
1972: The Fury of the Wolfman
1972: Dust in the Sun
1966-1973: Estudio 1 (TV Series, 5 episodes)
1973: Tarde para todos (TV Series, 1 episode)
1973: The Corruption of Chris Miller
1973: Counselor at Crime
1973: Celos, amor y Mercado Común
1974: Hay que matar a B.
1974: El chulo
1974: Emma, puertas oscuras
1974: Señora doctor
1974: Cinco almohadas para una noche
1974: Las correrías del Vizconde Arnau
1974: Los inmorales
1974: Aquí y ahora (TV Series, 1 episode)
1975: El comisario G. en el caso del cabaret
1976: Fox Hunt
1976: Daphnis and Chloe
1977: Las marginadas
1977: The Black Pearl
1980: Pato a la naranja (TV Series, 3 episodes)
1984: Condemned to Hell
1988: Jailbird Rock
1989: La blanca paloma
1996: La revista (TV Series, 1 episode)
1996-1997: Éste es mi barrio (TV Series, 2 episodes)
2001: La novia del príncipe (Video)
2005: Roast Rabbit, Peruvian Girl and Desolation (Short)
2005: Entre voces (Short)
2006-2007: Amar es para siempre (TV Series, 53 episodes)
2007: Hospital Central (TV Series, 1 episode)
2008: Guante blanco (TV Series, 1 episode)
2010: Armando (o la buena vecindad)

References

External links
 
 

1937 births
Argentine film actresses
20th-century Argentine women singers
Actresses from Buenos Aires
Living people